WLEE-FM (95.1 MHz) is a radio station broadcasting a country music format, licensed to Sherman, Mississippi, United States. The station, established in 1976 as a sister station to WLEE (1570 AM, former callsign WONA), is currently owned by Southern Electronics Company.

In September 2018, WLEE-FM changed their format from country to sports, branded as "ESPN Mississippi 95.1 The Fan" with programming from ESPN Radio.

On March 12, 2019, WLEE-FM changed their format from sports to country, branded as "95.1 The Farm".

Previous logo

References

External links
 Official Website
 

LEE-FM
Country radio stations in the United States
Radio stations established in 1976
Montgomery County, Mississippi
1976 establishments in Mississippi